Arthur Groves (27 September 1907 – 27 July 1979) was an English footballer who played in The Football League for Halifax Town, Blackburn Rovers, Derby County (£500 transfer fee), Portsmouth (£1,500 transfer fee) and Stockport County. He also played for Atherstone Town. He was born in Killamarsh.

His son, John Groves, played for Luton Town and Bournemouth in the nineteen-fifties and nineteen-sixties. Arthur's grandson is the Australian-based darts player, Loz Ryder.

References

1907 births
Year of death missing
People from Killamarsh
Footballers from Derbyshire
English footballers
Association football forwards
Langwith Miners Welfare F.C. players
Halifax Town A.F.C. players
Blackburn Rovers F.C. players
Derby County F.C. players
Portsmouth F.C. players
Stockport County F.C. players
Atherstone Town F.C. players
Heanor Athletic F.C. players
English Football League players